Dome was an English post-punk band, formed in 1980 and consisting of Bruce Gilbert (guitar, vocals, synthesizer) and Graham Lewis (bass, vocals, synthesizer) of Wire.

Background 

Gilbert and Lewis formed Dome during Wire's 1980–1984 hiatus. Over its first three albums, Wire's music had progressed from rapid-fire punk rock to moody, ambitious post-punk. Dome continued the experimentation, often abandoning traditional song structures in favor of found sounds, melodic fragments, and what critics Steven Grand and David Sheridan described as "lurching mechanical noises infrequently keeping a vague beat".

Between 1980 and 1981 Dome released three studio albums: Dome (1980), Dome 2 (1980) and Dome 3 (1981), on its own Dome Records label.

As well as releasing Dome band albums, Gilbert and Lewis produced and released records by Desmond Simmons (who played on Wire bandmate Colin Newman's solo albums A-Z and Not To) and A.C. Marias, on the band's label.

An album 3R4 was released in 1980 under the name B.C. Gilbert & G. Lewis as well as a single "Ends With the Sea" in 1981, followed by an EP Like This for Ages released as Cupol, all on the 4AD record label. In 1982 it released MZUI (Waterloo Gallery), an LP of recordings made at the Waterloo Gallery with Russell Mills.

In 1983 Gilbert and Lewis worked with Dome collaborator Angela Conway (aka A.C. Marias) to release Whilst Climbing Thieves Vie for Attention, an LP under the name P'O. The same year, they released an LP Or So It Seems under the name Duet Emmo—an anagram of "Dome" and "Mute"—with Daniel Miller, head of Mute Records, and released Will You Speak This Word a.k.a. Dome 4 on the Uniton label.

Wire reformed in 1984, although Dome continued to perform and record occasionally. Yclept, a collection of Dome's later work, was released on WMO in 1998.

Discography 

 Studio albums

 Dome (1980)
 Dome 2 (1980)
 Dome 3 (1981)
 Will You Speak This Word (1982)
 Yclept (1999)

 as B.C. Gilbert & G. Lewis

 3R4 (1980)

 as bcGilbert, gLewis & russellMills

 MZUI (1982)

 as Cupol

 Like This for Ages (1980)

 as Duet Emmo

 Or So It Seems (1983)

 as P'O

 Whilst Climbing Thieves Vie for Attention (1983)

 Compilations and reissues

 1 + 2 (1992)
 3 + 4 (1992)
 1-4+5 (2011)

 Singles

 "Jasz" (1981)
 "Ends With the Sea" (1981) (as B.C. Gilbert & G. Lewis)

References

External links 

 

English post-punk music groups
English experimental rock groups
English musical duos
Rock music duos
Wire (band)